Dennis Hughes may refer to:

Dennis Hughes (American football) (born 1948), American football player
Dennis Hughes (footballer) (1931–1990), English footballer
Dennis Hughes (rugby union) (born 1941), former Welsh rugby union international player
Dennis Hughes (snooker player), English snooker player